Laredo is the ninth studio album by American country music artist Steve Wariner. His last release for MCA Records, it produced three chart singles on the Billboard country charts: "The Domino Theory" at #7, "Precious Thing" at #8, and "There for Awhile" at #17. After the final single charted, Wariner was dropped from MCA's roster. He later signed to Arista Records in 1991 for the release of his next album, 1991's I Am Ready.

Tracks 1, 6, 8, and 9 were produced by Randy Scruggs, tracks 2, 3, and 7 by Tony Brown, and tracks 4, 5, and 10 by Garth Fundis.

Track listing

Personnel
 Eddie Bayers - drums
 David Briggs - keyboards
 Sam Bush - mandolin
 Bruce Dees - backing vocals
 Jerry Douglas - dobro
 Paul Franklin - pedal steel guitar, lap steel guitar
 Garth Fundis - backing vocals
 Steve Gibson - electric guitar
 Rob Hajacos - fiddle
 David Hungate - bass guitar
 John Jarvis - keyboards
 Brent Mason - electric guitar
 Mac McAnally - acoustic guitar, backing vocals
 Mark O'Connor - fiddle, mandolin
 Charlie McCoy - harmonica
 Steve Nathan - keyboards
 Dave Pomeroy - bass guitar
 Mike Reid - backing vocals
 Michael Rhodes - bass guitar
 Matt Rollings - keyboards
 Randy Scruggs - acoustic guitar
 Harry Stinson - backing vocals
 Wendy Waldman - backing vocals
 Reggie Young - electric guitar
 Steve Wariner - lead vocals, background vocals, acoustic guitar, electric guitar

Charts

Weekly charts

Year-end charts

References

1990 albums
MCA Records albums
Albums produced by Tony Brown (record producer)
Steve Wariner albums